Cynosciadium is a genus of flowering plants belonging to the family Apiaceae.

Its native range is Southern Central and Southeastern USA.

Species:
 Cynosciadium digitatum DC.

References

Apioideae
Apioideae genera